"Far Far Away" is a song by the British rock band Slade, released in 1974 as the lead single from the band's first soundtrack album and fifth studio album Slade in Flame, in promotion of the upcoming film of the same name. The song was written by lead vocalist Noddy Holder and bassist Jim Lea, and produced by Chas Chandler. It reached No. 2 in the UK, remaining in the charts for six weeks. The song was certified UK Silver by BPI in November 1974.

Background
By 1974, Slade had become a big success in the UK, Europe and beyond, however the band felt that continuing to provide 'more of the same' was not what they wanted to do. Their manager Chas Chandler suggested they do a movie, to which the band agreed. To accompany the film, Holder and Lea began writing material for a soundtrack album, which would continue to see the band break out of their successful formula and try different musical ideas. "Far Far Away" was selected as the album's lead single and was released in October 1974, reaching No. 2 in the UK.

"Far Far Away" originated with Holder. While on tour in America, he came up with the opening line while sitting on a balcony overlooking the Mississippi river in Memphis. Manager Chas Chandler urged him to go away and write the song immediately. Holder went to his hotel room and returned half an hour later having completed a basic version of the song, with the title "Letting Loose Around the World". Lea later developed the song further, in particular the chorus. In the band's 1984 biography Feel the Noize!, Lea recalled: ""Far Far Away" was a real collaboration between Nod and myself. The verse was Nod's and the chorus was mine. I wanted to record it like a barrelhouse song with a very airy feel for us but Chas wasn't keen."

In a 1986 fan club interview, guitarist Dave Hill spoke of the song's lyrics: "The song was written about being abroad wasn't it? "Yellow lights go down the Mississippi" and all that - being in the States and wanting to go back home. They were just experiences. Obviously, when you are on the road, you are writing about being on the road, you're writing about what's going on." Holder has cited the song as his favourite Slade song, while drummer Don Powell has stated it to be one of his favourites. Holder recalled in the late 1990s: "The atmosphere, the feel of it, the melody and the lyric, it all sat into place."

Release
"Far Far Away" was released on 7" vinyl by Polydor Records in the UK, Ireland, across Europe, Australia, New Zealand and the Philippines. The B-side, "O.K. Yesterday Was Yesterday", would appear as an album track on Slade in Flame. Later in 1975, a 7" flexi-disc was released in the UK by Smiths Crisps as part of their "Chart Busters" series. "Far Far Away" was the A-side, with "Thanks for the Memory (Wham Bam Thank You Mam)" as the B-side. In 1989, a re-issue of the single in the Netherlands was released by BR Music. It featured "How Does It Feel" as the B-side.

In 1992, the song featured on the Soundtrack of the German film Go Trabi Go 2: Das war der Wilde Osten and in the following year the fashion label C&A produced a TV advertisement ("Don Quixote") which used the song. Following the rising popularity of the advert, "Far Far Away" was re-released in Germany that year on 7" and CD formats. It reached No. 19 on the German Singles Chart.

Promotion
A music video was filmed to promote the single, which was filmed by the same film crew the band were working with for the filming of Flame. Lea later recalled the video would have been directed by either Gavrik Lasey or Richard Loncraine. The video features the band performing the song while wearing their "Flame" outfits. In Germany, the band performed the song on the TV show Disco. The band also performed the song on the Dutch AVRO TV show TopPop.

Critical reception
Upon release, Record Mirror stated that the song featured a "very melodic Noddy, no screaming or shouting", adding "but it's very good, strong chorus line and backing". In a review of Slade in Flame, Rosemary Horride of Disc said: ""Far Far Away" [is] to my mind one of their more classy hits".

Formats
7" Single
"Far Far Away" - 3:33
"O.K. Yesterday Was Yesterday" - 3:51

7" Single (1975 Smiths Chart Busters release)
"Far Far Away" - 3:33
"Thanks for the Memory (Wham Bam Thank You Mam)" - 4:33

7" Single (Dutch 1989 release)
"Far Far Away" - 3:33
"How Does It Feel" - 5:55

7" Single (German 1993 release)
"Far Far Away" - 3:33
"Skweeze Me Pleeze Me" - 4:26

CD Single (German 1993 release)
"Far Far Away" - 3:34
"Mama Weer All Crazee Now" - 3:41
"Skweeze Me Pleeze Me" - 4:26

CD Single (German 1993 release, cardboard version)
"Far Far Away" - 3:34
"Skweeze Me Pleeze Me" - 4:26

Chart performance

Personnel
Slade
Noddy Holder - lead vocals, guitar
Dave Hill - lead guitar, backing vocals
Jim Lea - bass, organ, backing vocals
Don Powell - drums

Additional personnel
Chas Chandler - producer

Cover versions
 In 1993, the electronic band Red 2 recorded a cover of the song and released it as a single in Germany and Belgium.
 In 1995, Czech metal band Arakain recorded a version (Dal Dal Se Ptej) for their album Legendy
 In 1996, the reformed version of glam rock band Mud performed the track live.
 In 1999, Denmark band Pretty Maids recorded a version for their album First Cuts... and Then Some.
 In 2006, Denmark band Fenders recorded a cover of the song on their album It's Magic - hits fra 70'erne.
 In 2012, the song was covered and translated to Ukrainian by singer-songwriter Yuriy Veres for his 2012 album 60/70.
 In 2012, The Wonder Stuff covered the song on a disc of cover versions called From the Midlands with Love that accompanied their Oh No It's... The Wonder Stuff CD.

References

1974 singles
Slade songs
Songs written by Noddy Holder
Songs written by Jim Lea
Song recordings produced by Chas Chandler
Number-one singles in Norway
Rock ballads
1974 songs
Polydor Records singles